The 37th (North Hampshire) Regiment of Foot was a line infantry regiment of the British Army, raised in Ireland in February 1702. Under the Childers Reforms it amalgamated with the 67th (South Hampshire) Regiment of Foot to become the Hampshire Regiment (later the Royal Hampshire Regiment) in 1881.

History

Early years

The regiment was raised in Ireland by Lieutenant-General Thomas Meredyth as Meredyth's Regiment in February 1702. It embarked for the Netherlands in May 1703 and fought under the Duke of Marlborough at the Battle of Schellenberg in July 1704, the Battle of Blenheim in August 1704 and the Battle of Ramillies in May 1706 as well as the Battle of Oudenarde in July 1708 and the Battle of Malplaquet in September 1709 during the War of the Spanish Succession. The regiment embarked for Canada in 1711 as part of the Quebec Expedition but lost 8 officers and 253 men when the ships in which it was sailing foundered on the rocks on the Saint Lawrence River; the expedition returned home. It was also in action at the Capture of Vigo in October 1719.

The regiment next saw action at the Battle of Dettingen in June 1743 during the War of the Austrian Succession. It also fought at the Battle of Falkirk in January 1746 during the Jacobite rebellion when its colonel, Sir Robert Munro, 6th Baronet, was shot and then finished off with three sword blows to the head. It went on to fight under the command of Colonel Lewis Dejean at the Battle of Culloden in April 1746 and was ranked the 37th Foot in 1747. The regiment returned to the Netherlands and fought at the Battle of Lauffeld in July 1747.

On 1 July 1751 a royal warrant was issued which provided that in future regiments would no longer be known by their colonel's name, but would bear a regimental number based on their precedence: the regiment became the 37th Regiment of Foot. The second battalion became the 75th Regiment of Foot in 1758.

The regiment fought at the Battle of Minden in August 1759 during the Seven Years' War. After the battle the men of the regiment   picked dog-roses from the hedges and put them in their headdresses to celebrate the victory. It also took part in a skirmish at Grebenstein in June 1762 and another at Fellinghausen in July 1762. It was then garrisoned in Menorca from 1763 to 1769.

The regiment embarked for North America for service in the American Revolutionary War in 1776 and was present at the Battle of Long Island in August 1776 and the British surrender at the end of the Siege of Yorktown in September 1781. It became the 37th (the North Hampshire) Regiment of Foot in 1782.

Napoleonic wars
The regiment was next in action at the Battle of Tournay in May 1794 in the Flanders Campaign of the French Revolutionary Wars. It was posted to the West Indies from 1800 to 1809 to Gibraltar from 1812 to 1814 and to Canada from 1814 to 1826.

The Victorian era

The regiment embarked for Ceylon in 1846 and took part in the suppression of the Matale rebellion in 1847. It moved to India in spring 1857 and, having arrived by steamer on the Son River, opened fire on the attacking mutineers at the Siege of Arrah in July 1857 during the Indian Rebellion. It returned to England in 1861 and was sent to Ireland in 1865 before returning to India in 1866.

As part of the Cardwell Reforms of the 1870s, where single-battalion regiments were linked together to share a single depot and recruiting district in the United Kingdom, the 37th was linked with the 67th (South Hampshire) Regiment of Foot, and assigned to district no. 40 at Lower Barracks in Winchester. The regiment returned to England in 1875 and then moved to Ireland in 1880. On 1 July 1881 the Childers Reforms came into effect and the regiment amalgamated with the 67th (South Hampshire) Regiment of Foot to become the Hampshire Regiment (later the Royal Hampshire Regiment).

Battle honours
Battle honours won by the regiment were:
 Minden, Tournay, Peninsula 
 Blenheim, Ramillies, Oudenarde, Malplaquet, Dettingen (all awarded to successor regiment, 1882)

Regimental Colonels
Colonels of the Regiment were:
1702–1710: Lt-Gen. Thomas Meredyth
1710–1715: Col. William Windress
1715–1717: Gen. John Fane, 7th Earl of Westmorland (Baron Catherlough)
1717–1722: Col. Edward Montagu, Viscount Hinchingbrooke
1722–1735: Brig-Gen. Hon. Robert Murray
1735–1745: Maj-Gen. Hon. Henry Ponsonby (killed at the Battle of Fontenoy)
1745–1746: Col. Sir Robert Munro, Bt. (killed at the Battle of Falkirk)
1746–1752: Lt-Gen. Lewis Dejean

37th Regiment of Foot
1752–1768: Lt-Gen. Hon. James Stuart
1768–1773: Lt-Gen. Sir George Gray, Bt.
1773–1783: Lt-Gen. Sir Eyre Coote, KB

37th (the North Hampshire) Regiment of Foot
1783–1798: Gen. Sir John Dalling 
1798–1810: Gen. Sir Hew Whitefoord Dalrymple
1810–1814: Lt-Gen. Sir Charles Ross, Bt
1814–1831: Gen. Sir Charles Green, Bt
1831–1851: Gen. Hon. Sir Alexander Duff, GCH
1851–1858: Lt-Gen. William Smelt, CB
1858–1862: Lt-Gen. John Fraser
1862–1879: Gen. Sir Thomas Simson Pratt, KCB
1879–1881: Gen. Sir Edmund Haythorne, KCB

References

Sources

External links
History of the 37th (North Hampshire) Regiment of Foot by Paul Jerrard

Royal Hampshire Regiment
Infantry regiments of the British Army
Military units and formations in Hampshire
Military units and formations established in 1702
Regiments of the British Army in the American Revolutionary War
Military units and formations disestablished in 1881
Military units and formations of the United Kingdom in the Peninsular War
1702 establishments in England
British military units and formations of the War of 1812